Hutegotherium is an extinct genus of tegotheriid docodont known from partial remains found in Middle Jurassic (Bathonian age) Itat Formation of Krasnoyarsk Krai, Russia. It was first named by Averianov, A. A.; Lopatin, A. V.; Krasnolutskii, S. A.; and Ivantsov, S. V. in 2010 and the type species is Hutegotherium yaomingi.

Phylogeny 
Cladogram after Averianov et al. (2010).

References

Docodonts
Prehistoric cynodont genera
Fossil taxa described in 2010
Extinct animals of Russia
Taxa named by Alexander O. Averianov